"Solitaire" is a song by American rapper Gucci Mane featuring American hip-hop group Migos and fellow American rapper Lil Yachty, released on March 2, 2018 as the lead single from the former's twelfth studio album Evil Genius (2018). The song was produced by Da Honorable C.N.O.T.E., DJ Durel, Quavo of Migos, and Lab Cook.

Composition
"Solitaire" is a trap song that features an "electronic-sounding instrumental reminiscent of an '80s video game". In it, Gucci Mane raps about his lifestyle and compares it to his past life, also mentioning in the chorus playing solitaire in a prison cell when he was incarcerated. The rappers center on their money and jewelry in the song.

Music video
A music video for the song was released on May 22, 2018. Directed by Clifton Bell, it sees the rappers showing their jewelry as they rap in a room resembling the inside of a diamond, while a trio of women puff on vape pens.

Charts

References

2018 singles
2018 songs
Gucci Mane songs
Migos songs
Lil Yachty songs
Atlantic Records singles
Songs written by Gucci Mane
Songs written by Quavo
Songs written by Takeoff (rapper)
Songs written by Lil Yachty